Pursuit Until Capture is a studio album by the Dutch band Peter Pan Speedrock. It was released on October 8, 2007.

Track listing
"Speedfreak Blitzkrieg"
"(Hangin' With The) Wrong Crowd"
"Evil Sweet Thing"
"You Do It Or You Don't"
"Bottle-O-Dope"
"Cool-School Drop-Out"
"S.O.B.S.O.S."
"Pursuit Until Capture"
"Gimme Some"
"Straight Back To Hormoneville"
"Heatseeker"
"Dopefiend"
"Sick Boy"

External links
Official Peter Pan Speedrock website
 Website of Peter Pan Speedrock local rockscene

Peter Pan Speedrock albums
2007 albums